Biathlon at the 2019 Winter Universiade was held at the Biathlon Academy in Krasnoyarsk from 4 to 10 March 2019.

Men's events

Women's events

Mixed events

Medal table

References

External links
Results
Results Book – Biathlon

 
Biathlon
2019
Winter Universiade